Nour TV is the first Persian language Sunni Islamic television channel. The channel is operated from Dubai Media City in the United Arab Emirates. It offers mainly Sunni religious programs and documentaries in the Persian language, but also telecasts Persian dubbed Sunni religious dramas such as Omar and Salah Al-Din.

External links
 Official website 
 Official website 

Islamic television networks
Persian-language television stations
Television stations in the United Arab Emirates